Nikinapi was an Illiniwek chief who welcomed the Marquette-Joliet party in 1673 at a Peoria camp.

References
 Armstrong, Virginia Irving. (1971). I Have Spoken. Sage Books, The Swallow Press Inc. Page 5.

17th-century Native Americans
Native American leaders
Date of birth unknown
Date of death unknown